Carly Simon: Original Album Series is a five CD set by American singer-songwriter Carly Simon, released on October 10, 2011.

The set is a part of Rhino's Original Album Series, and collects Simon's first five albums; Carly Simon (1971), Anticipation (1971), No Secrets (1972), Hotcakes (1974), and Playing Possum (1975). The discs are packaged in mini LP cardboard replicas with the original artwork, and housed inside a slipcased box. The discs themselves are reissues of the original Elektra releases, none have been remastered, and no bonus tracks are included.

Reception

Stephen Thomas Erlewine of AllMusic commended the set as "an easy, affordable, and handsome way to get Carly Simon's prime", and awarded it 4 out of 5 stars.

Track listings

Notes
 signifies a writer by additional lyrics

References

External links
 Carly Simon's Official Website

Carly Simon compilation albums
2011 compilation albums